DVD±R (also DVD+/-R, or "DVD plus/dash R") is not a separate DVD format, but rather is a shorthand term for a DVD drive that can accept both of the common recordable DVD formats (i.e. DVD-R and DVD+R). Likewise, DVD±RW (also written as DVD±R/W, DVD±R/RW, DVD±R/±RW, DVD+/-RW, and other arbitrary ways) handles both common rewritable disc types (i.e. DVD-RW and DVD+RW, but not usually DVD-RAM).

See also 
 DVD-R
 DVD+R
 DVD-RW
 DVD+RW

References

DVD